Singapore participated at the 2019 Southeast Asian Games in the Philippines from 30 November to 11 December 2019. The Games were held in multiple cities across Philippines in four main areas or hubs namely Manila, Clark and Subic.

Competitors
Singapore participated in 48 sports with 666 athletes, the biggest contingent sent to an away Games.

Source:

Medal summary

Medal by sport

Medal by date

Source:

Medalists

References

Southeast Asian Games
2019
Nations at the 2019 Southeast Asian Games